WCLO (1230 AM) is a radio station  broadcasting a news–talk format. Licensed to Janesville, Wisconsin, United States, the station serves the Janesville area. The station is currently owned by Benjamin Thompson and features programming from CBS News Radio, Premiere Radio Networks and Westwood One.

History
WCLO was originally licensed in 1925 to broadcast at Camp Lake, west of Kenosha. Its owner at that time was a real estate development company with a project called Camp Lake Oaks, from which came the call letters assigned by the government to the small 50-watt station. After three years of operating at Camp Lake, WCLO was moved by its licensees to Kenosha. In 1929, a group of Kenosha businessmen organized the WCLO Radio Corp., acquiring the rights to the station and receiving permission to increase its power to 100 watts. The WCLO Radio Corp. operated the station in Kenosha for a year.

On February 25, 1930, an agreement was reached transferring WCLO's license and equipment to Harry H. Bliss of Janesville. His son, Sidney H. Bliss, became president and general manager of the new venture. Studios were constructed on the third floor of The Gazette Building in Janesville. The station began broadcasting on August 1, 1930. Wisconsin Governor Walter Kohler headed the list of guest speakers on the inaugural program. Broadcasts from The Gazette building studios were supplemented by remote control broadcasts that reached listeners throughout southern Wisconsin.

WCLO's first transmitting station had twin towers on County Highway A, four miles east of Janesville.

For the first 11 years of its life, the station operated as a daytime station, signing on at local sunrise and signing off at sunset.

Past Personalities
Pat Alan, newscaster (1945-1946)

References

External links

CLO
News and talk radio stations in the United States
Radio stations established in 1925
1925 establishments in Wisconsin